The Vii (lit. "Power Stick" or "The Power is Great") is a Shanzhai video game console similar in design to Nintendo's Wii. It was originally released in China in 2007. The Vii was not intended to be a seventh-generation console like the Wii, and was instead part of the dedicated console genre of inexpensive consoles with built-in games.

The Vii's Puppy Rod controller is similar in size and design to the Wii Remote. It features motion detection but not the pointing capability of the Wii Remote. The Vii also comes in three colors: "Arctic White", "Hot Pink" and "Mint Blue".

A redesign of the console, colloquially called the Vii 2 by bloggers, features remodeled controllers and a design reminiscent of the Nintendo Entertainment System and the PlayStation 3, as well as support for both NTSC and PAL televisions.

In 2008, the Vii was released in Japan under the name V Sports (Sport Vii).

Games

Happy Tennis - a tennis game (clone of Wii Sports Tennis)
Catch Fish - a fishing game (clone of Wii Play Fishing)
Bowling - a bowling game (clone of Wii Sports Bowling)
Alacrity Golf - a mini golf game (clone of Carnival Games: Mini-Golf)
Table Tennis - a table tennis game (clone of Wii Play Table Tennis)
Smart Dart - a simulated darts game
Fry Egg - a cooking game (clone of Cooking Mama)
Bird Knight - a tilt-to-play game (clone of Balloon Fight)
Fever Move - a music and dance game (similar in style to Dance Dance Revolution with Guitar Hero elements but mostly it’s a clone of game 3 from Schnappi)
Come On – A distance game, in which one feeds seals
Fantasy Baseball – a baseball game (clone of Wii Sports Baseball)
Free Craps – a shake Dice Roller designed to simulate dice.

In addition to the games that were included with the first release of the Vii (Free Craps, which was not included on Vii 2), all models of the Vii also include a cartridge entitled 7in1 or 10in1 which features seven or ten additional games.

Three different cartridges exist:

VC-1 Exclusives:
MaJong13 - a Mahjong game
MaJong16 - Similar to MaJong13

VC-1 and VC-2 cartridges contain:
Bubble Blaster -  a Puzz Loop/Zuma like game
Jewel Master 2 - a Magic Jewelry/Columns like game
Pinball Fish - a Breakout like game
Squirrel Bobble - a Puzzle Bobble/Bust-A-Move like game
Lightning Plan - a Silkworm like game

Several other games have also been released in cartridge format. Some examples of these are:

VC-2 Exclusives:
 "Plumber" - a platform game
 "Mr Onion" - a Donkey Kong like game
 "Fire Fighter" - a Fire like game
 "Dream Bubble" - a version of Tetris
 "Bump Jump" - an Arkanoid-like game

VC-3 Exclusives:
 "Brave Kaka" - a Mario Bros. clone
 "Hero Legend" - a clone of Don Doko Don
 "Rapid Stream" - a submarine game
 "Super Move Fun" - a Bejeweled like game
 "Magic Jelly" - a Bomberman meets Q*Bert like game
 "Bump Bomb" - A Marbles like game
 "Tiger Rescue" - a vertical scrolling shooter

VG Pocket Caplet

The games listed below are games that are also on the VG Pocket Caplet, a handheld also made by JungleTac.

 "Pinball fish"  Underwater Pinball "Bubble Blaster"
 "Plumber" a.k.a. Codename: Plumber "Jewel Master 2"
 "Magic Jelly"
 "Mr. Onion"
 "Dream Bubble" a.k.a. Bubble Wubble "Hero Legend" a.k.a. Legendary Hero "Tiger Rescue"
 "Bump Jump" a.k.a. Battle Blocks II''

Zone 60 and Wireless 60

While the Vii itself appears to no longer be in production, JungleTac produced games for at least three other similar plug-and-play consoles, the Zone 60, the Wireless 60, and the Wireless Air 60. Many Vii titles and similar games appear on these consoles. However, these consoles' controllers do not have true motion sensors as the Vii does (with the exception of the Wireless Air 60), so the controls are simplified to the point where any motion just triggers a press of the A button. As a result, many of the games need to use power meters to determine distance or power.

Titles that appear are:

Bowling
Fantasy Baseball (renamed Baseball Practice)
Catch Fish (renamed Fishing)
Alacrity golf (renamed Golf)
Come On! (Wireless 60 only, renamed Sea-world)
Free Craps (Wireless 60 only)
Bubble Blaster (Zone 60 only, renamed Ball Blaster)
Brave Kaka (Zone 60 only, renamed Brave Heart)
Bump Bomb (Zone 60 only, renamed Lady Bugs)
Bump Jump (Wireless 60 only)
Fire Fighter
Hero Legend
Jewel Master 2
Lightning Plan
Magic Jelly (Wireless 60 only)
Mr. Onion
Pinball Fish (Wireless 60 only)
Plumber (Zone 60 only, renamed Plumber Man)
Rapid Stream
Squirrel Bobble (Zone 60 only)
Tiger Rescue (Zone 60 only)

References

External links

Official Vii page of KenSingTon, the manufacturer/distributor of the Vii (defunct)
Engadget China review (translated by Google)
Pictures of the Vii 

Dedicated consoles
Seventh-generation video game consoles
Products introduced in 2007
Copyright infringement
Video game console clones
Sunplus-based video game consoles